Lee Woo-jung is a South Korean television screenwriter. She is best known for writing the tvN television dramas Reply series: Reply 1997 (2012), Reply 1994 (2013) and Reply 1988 (2015–2016). She also wrote the popular variety-reality shows 2 Days & 1 Night, Qualifications of Men, Grandpas Over Flowers, Sisters Over Flowers, Youth Over Flowers and Three Meals a Day.

She was given a presidential commendation for her work on Grandpas Over Flowers at the 2013 Korea Content Awards, which praised her for its depiction of "four elderly backpackers with humor and warmth."

In 2018, she established the production company Egg Is Coming and appointed ex-KBS and Monster Union PD Ko Jeong-seok as CEO. The company was acquired by CJ ENM four years later.

Filmography

As variety show writer

Television series

Accolades

Awards and nominations

State honors

Notes

References

External links
 
 

Living people
Year of birth missing (living people)
South Korean screenwriters
South Korean television writers
Sookmyung Women's University alumni